Henry Ernest Boyes (1844–1919) was an American entrepreneur and Navy captain. Boyes founded Boyes Hot Springs in California after discovering hot springs on his property.

Early life

Henry Boyes was born into a wealthy family in 1844 in Kingston upon Hull in England. His father was Faulkner Boyes and mother, Margaret Mathilda Saner. of He had two brothers. Both died as children. He attended Queen Mary's Grammar School in Ripon.

Mid-life and career

Boyes served in the British Navy from 1858 to 1872. During that time, he served in the Indian Navy for four years in Mumbai. After leaving the Navy, he managed an indigo plantation. He returned to Europe and visited Switzerland, where he met Antoinette Charlotte Edwards. The two married in 1883 in England. Boyes sold his family estate for $250,000 and the couple moved to San Francisco, California.

Founding of Boyes Hot Springs

In 1883 the Boyes' moved to Sonoma Valley, where they bought 75 acres of land after hearing about the area from Mariano Guadalupe Vallejo. The couple lived on a house that was built in 1849 by T.M. Leavenworth. Eventually, another house was built on a 15-acre part of the property, which the couple named "El Mirador." 
 
Vallejo had told Boyes about natural hot springs in the area and in 1888, Boyes dug two 200 feet deep wells on the property. They pumped the hot water into pools and promoted the therapeutic benefits of the water to the public. They started with one pool, eventually expanding to multiple pools as the site grew in popularity with tourists from San Francisco. The property eventually served as a resort with overnight accommodations. Boyes incorporated the resort as the Boyes' Hot Mineral Springs Co. in 1902. In 1923, the resort was destroyed by a fire. Today, the Fairmont Sonoma Mission Inn & Spa is located on the site of the former Boyes resort.

Later life and legacy

Boyes is buried in Mountain Cemetery in Sonoma. His grave is next to the tomb of Mariano Guadalupe Vallejo.

Gallery

References

1844 births
1919 deaths
19th-century American businesspeople
19th-century Royal Navy personnel
Businesspeople from Kingston upon Hull
Indian Navy personnel
Military personnel from Kingston upon Hull
People from Sonoma, California